The 1975–76 Rugby League Premiership was the second end of season Rugby League Premiership competition.

The winners were St Helens.

First round

Semi-finals

Final

Bracket

References

1976 in English rugby league